Ivan Pavlovych Kazanets (12 October 1918 – 2013) was a Ukrainian and Soviet politician who held several posts, including chairman of the council of ministers of the Ukrainian SSR and the Soviet minister of ferrous metallurgy.

Biography
Ivan Kazanets was born in Lotsmanska village in Dnipropetrovsk Oblast, central Ukraine.
He served as the chairman of the council of ministers of the Ukrainian SSR (equivalent of today's Prime Minister of Ukraine) from 1963 to 1965. He was the minister of ferrous metallurgy of the Soviet Union for almost 20 years. His tenure ended in July 1985 when Serafim Kolpakov replaced him in the post.

Awards
During his public service, Ivan Kazanets received numerous civil and state awards and recognitions, including the Order of Lenin (in 1957, 1958, 1966, 1968 and 1971), the Order of the October Revolution (in 1978), and 20 medals, four of which are from foreign countries. In 1996, he became a meritorious metallurgist of the Russian Federation.

References

1918 births
2013 deaths
Communist Party of Ukraine (Soviet Union) politicians
Politicians from Dnipro
Politburo of the Central Committee of the Communist Party of Ukraine (Soviet Union) members
Politicians of the Ukrainian Soviet Socialist Republic
Chairpersons of the Council of Ministers of Ukraine
Recipients of the Order of Lenin
Ukrainian emigrants to Russia
Fourth convocation members of the Verkhovna Rada of the Ukrainian Soviet Socialist Republic
Fifth convocation members of the Verkhovna Rada of the Ukrainian Soviet Socialist Republic
Sixth convocation members of the Verkhovna Rada of the Ukrainian Soviet Socialist Republic
Burials in Troyekurovskoye Cemetery